General elections were held in Venezuela on 5 December 1993. The presidential elections were won by Rafael Caldera of National Convergence, who received 30.5% of the vote. Democratic Action remained the largest party in the Chamber of Deputies and Senate, which were elected on separate ballots for the first time. Voter turnout was 60.2%, the lowest since World War II.

Background
The election campaign was dominated by the corruption charges brought against sitting President Carlos Andrés Pérez, which led to his impeachment on 20 May 1993. He was replaced by Octavio Lepage as Acting President until Ramón José Velásquez was elected by Congress as interim President on 5 June. An atmosphere of economic and political crisis prevailed, with general economic problems compounded by a banking crisis, and a declining legitimacy of the traditional main parties, Democratic Action and Copei. The previous year had seen two coup attempts in February and November, reflecting widespread popular discontent with the political establishment.

Rafael Caldera, founder of Copei, rejected his old party and led a "National Convergence" of 17 smaller parties - including the Movement for Socialism, the Democratic Republican Union, the People's Electoral Movement and the Communist Party of Venezuela. His campaign promises included pardoning the 1992 coup plotters, including Hugo Chávez.

The Congressional elections were the first held under a mixed member proportional representation system, modelled on the German system, with some variations. The traditionally dominant Democratic Action and Copei "supported it because it looked the most like the system under which they had prospered". The MMP system continued to use the old formula of assigning seats to states based on multiplying the total population by 0.55%, with a minimum of three deputies from each state (thus over-representing sparsely populated states). Half each state's seats were then elected in single seat districts, and the remainder by closed party list. Parties could receive up to five additional seats based on their national vote total, to provide greater proportionality.

Results

President

Senate

Chamber of Deputies

Aftermath
Andrés Velásquez of Radical Cause gained 22%, and "filed complaints of irregularities, saying that officials from his party were prevented from witnessing vote counting."

References

1993 in Venezuela
1993 elections in South America
Elections in Venezuela
Presidential elections in Venezuela
December 1993 events in South America